David Allan Sutherland (born February 20, 1966) is an American professional golfer.

Following in his older brother Kevin's footsteps, Sutherland attended Fresno State and was an All-American golfer there. He turned pro in 1989.

Sutherland played on the PGA Tour in 1991 after finishing T36 at qualifying school. He failed to earn enough money (finished 152nd on the money list) to retain his tour card. He played on the Nationwide Tour in 1992 and 1993. He regained his PGA Tour card for 1997 by finishing 17th at qualifying school and continued playing on the tour through 2004. In early 2001, he suffered a torn labrum in his left shoulder that required surgery. He chose to return to play at the Buy.com Utah Classic in September and won the tournament. He failed to win enough money on the PGA Tour in 2002, playing on a medical exemption, to retain his card for 2003. However, he finished T11 in qualifying school and played 2003 and 2004 on the PGA Tour. He dropped to the Nationwide Tour in 2006 and retired in 2007.

Sutherland became director of golf at Sacramento State in 2007.

Amateur wins
1989 Western Amateur

Professional wins (2)

Buy.com Tour wins (1)

Other wins (1)
1990 Northern California Open

See also
1990 PGA Tour Qualifying School graduates
1996 PGA Tour Qualifying School graduates
2002 PGA Tour Qualifying School graduates

References

External links

ESPN.com Profile

American male golfers
Fresno State Bulldogs men's golfers
PGA Tour golfers
Golfers from Sacramento, California
Sportspeople from Roseville, California
1966 births
Living people